Indiahoma Public Schools. IPS is a school with elementary, JH, and HS. It is in the state of Oklahoma. It is also in Comanche County. This school has around 200 to 300 students every year.

External links
 Indiahoma Public Schools

Schools in Comanche County, Oklahoma